The Pingdingshan–Luohe–Zhoukou high-speed railway, abbreviated as Pingluozhou high-speed railway, is a planned high-speed railway line in Henan, China.

Stations

References

High-speed railway lines in China
Rail transport in Henan